Every Saturday Night is a 1936 American comedy film directed by James Tinling and starring June Lang, Thomas Beck and Jed Prouty. This is the first of 17 low-budget films about the Jones Family (named Evers initially).

Cast
 June Lang as Bonnie Evers  
 Thomas Beck as Clark Newall  
 Jed Prouty as Mr. Evers  
 Spring Byington as Mrs. Evers  
 Florence Roberts as Granny Evers  
 Kenneth Howell as Jack Evers  
 George Ernest as Roger Evers  
 June Carlson as Lucy Evers  
 Paul Stanton as Mr. Mewell 
 Billy Mahan as Bobby Evers  
 Kay Hughes as Patty Newall  
 Phyllis Fraser as Millicent  
 Fred Wallace as Jed 
 Oscar Apfel as Mr. Dayton

References

Bibliography
 Bernard A. Drew. Motion Picture Series and Sequels: A Reference Guide. Routledge, 2013.

External links
 

1936 films
1936 comedy films
American comedy films
Films directed by James Tinling
20th Century Fox films
American black-and-white films
Films scored by Samuel Kaylin
1930s English-language films
1930s American films